Quebec autonomism is a political belief that Quebec should seek to gain more political autonomy as a province, while remaining a part of the Canadian federation. The concept was first articulated by Maurice Duplessis and idea supported by the Quebec nationalist and conservative Union Nationale, Action démocratique du Québec and its successor Coalition Avenir Québec parties which believed in greater provincial autonomy of Quebec without granting independence from Canada. The only parties to support this belief are the Coalition Avenir Québec and Équipe Autonomiste.

Drawing inspiration from René Lévesque's "beau risque", and Robert Bourassa's work on the Meech Lake Accord and Charlottetown Accord, its goals are, in short:

Setting out the procedures for constitutional change
A sharing of jurisdictions between the federal government and Quebec
Framework for federal spending powers
Institutional reform
Reform of intergovernmental policies

In a speech to delegates of the ADQ, party leader Mario Dumont, on 8 May 2006, Dumont said that Quebec should seek to re-open negotiations with the federal government over Quebec's status in Confederation, and should eventually ratify the Constitution of Canada.

References and notes

See also
Politics of Quebec
Quebec federalist ideology
Quebec sovereignty movement

Politics of Quebec
Quebec nationalism
Autonomy